Hẻm (or Ngõ in Northern Vietnam) are the terms used to describe narrow streets branching off of main roads. Hẻm are characterized by their narrow width and are lined with narrow, multistory buildings known as tube houses, creating a dense and vertical urban form. In Ho Chi Minh City, approximately 65% of residents live in hẻm. Hẻm are numbered and referred to by the name of the major street it branches off of, similarly to Sois in Thailand. Slashes are used to indicated an address in a hẻm, so the address "36/23 Hẻm Lê Thị Riêng" indicates the house is number 36 in the 23rd Hẻm off Lê Thị Riêng street.

See also 

 Soi
 Hutong

References 

Vietnamese words and phrases
Types of streets
Types of roads
Buildings and structures in Asia
Urban studies and planning terminology